Averell Edward "Li'l Abner" Daniell (November 6, 1914 – January 28, 1999) was an American football tackle. He played high school football for Mt. Lebanon High School and college football for the University of Pittsburgh as a walk-on.  He played professionally for the Brooklyn Dodgers and the Green Bay Packers in the National Football League (NFL). After leaving football, he founded the Ionics Corp., which was later sold to GE. He was elected to the College Football Hall of Fame in 1975.

References

1914 births
1999 deaths
All-American college football players
Players of American football from Pittsburgh
American football tackles
Pittsburgh Panthers football players
Brooklyn Dodgers (NFL) players
Green Bay Packers players
College Football Hall of Fame inductees